The Copper Scroll is a 2006 Christian apocalyptic novel by Joel C. Rosenberg. The novel is the fourth book in the Last Jihad book series. It involves the Biblical prophecies concerning the restoration of the Jewish Temple, tied in by the author to the treasures of the Copper Scroll.

References

External links
 Authors home page

2006 American novels
American Christian novels
English-language novels
2006 speculative fiction novels
Apocalyptic novels
Novels set in Jerusalem
Tabernacle and Temples in Jerusalem